Valero Rivera Folch (born 22 February 1985) is a Spanish handball player who plays for HBC Nantes and the Spain national team. His father is the former handballer Valero Rivera López.

Individual awards 
 All-Star Left Wing of EHF Champions League: 2021

References

1985 births
Living people
Spanish male handball players
Sportspeople from Barcelona
Liga ASOBAL players
FC Barcelona Handbol players
Expatriate handball players
Spanish expatriate sportspeople in France
BM Aragón players